Richard 'Dick' Sleath (3 October 1863 – 10 October 1922) was an Australian politician.

Born in Ceres, Fife to ploughman Richard Sleath and Mary Fernie, he migrated to Queensland in 1877, becoming a shearer and prospector. In 1882 he moved to Sydney, working as a contractor before mining at Broken Hill from 1887. On 11 March 1887, he married Jane Dawson with whom he had four sons. He helped found the first Socialist League at Broken Hill and was a member of the central executive of the Labor Party in 1898. In 1894 he was elected to the New South Wales Legislative Assembly as the Labor member for Wilcannia. He lost his Labour endorsement in 1901 but was re-elected as an Independent Labor candidate, losing his seat in 1904. In 1917 Sleath, a supporter of conscription, joined the Nationalist Party. He died in Sydney in 1922.

References

 

1863 births
1922 deaths
Independent members of the Parliament of New South Wales
Members of the New South Wales Legislative Assembly
Scottish emigrants to Australia
People from Queensland
Politicians from Sydney
Australian Labor Party members of the Parliament of New South Wales